Scott Ashley Leather (born 30 September 1992) is an English semi-professional footballer who plays for Chorley as a defender.

Career
Born in Sale, Greater Manchester, Leather was a member of Crewe Alexandra's youth team between the ages of 8 and 16, before moving to Preston North End in 2009. Leather made his first team debut for Preston on 30 April 2011 against Ipswich Town in a 2–1 defeat. In May 2012, Leather was released from the club after being told his contract would not be renewed. He signed for Altrincham in July 2012.

In the summer of 2016 he rejected a new deal at the club, leaving his hometown club after 179 appearances in all competitions. He signed for Chorley in May 2016.

Career statistics

Honours
Conference North play-offs: 2013–14

References

1992 births
Living people
People from Sale, Greater Manchester
English footballers
Association football defenders
Crewe Alexandra F.C. players
Preston North End F.C. players
Altrincham F.C. players
Chorley F.C. players
English Football League players
National League (English football) players